Bagnaria (Lombard: Bagnèra)is a comune (municipality) in the Province of Pavia in the Italian region Lombardy, located about 70 km south of Milan and about 40 km south of Pavia. As of 31 December 2004, it had a population of 640 and an area of 16.6 km².

Bagnaria borders the following municipalities: Gremiasco, Ponte Nizza, Varzi.

Demographic evolution

References 

Cities and towns in Lombardy